Twitch is a Student Academy Award-nominated short film directed by Leah Meyerhoff and starring Emma Galvin, Peter Corrie, Toni Meyerhoff.

Twitch kicked off the film festival circuit by winning a Grand Jury Prize at Slamdance and going on to screen in over 200 film festivals worldwide. Twitch has since won over a dozen international awards and is currently airing on the Independent Film Channel and Skandinavia TV.

Plot
Twitch tells the story of a young girl torn between two worlds: her domestic life, where she must care for her mother who uses a wheelchair, and her escape into the emerging world of sexuality with her eager, hormone-addled boyfriend. Leah's mother plays the Mother role in an essentially autobiographical role for the filmmaker. The making of the film was a component of the IFC series Film School, chronicling the first time filmmaking efforts of four New York University graduate film school students.

Cast
Emma Galvin as Daughter
Peter Corrie as Boyfriend
Toni Meyerhoff as Mother

Awards
Student Academy Awards — Finalist
Slamdance — Honorable Mention
Avignon Film Festival — Best American Short
Rhode Island International Film Festival — Honorable Mention
Golden Star Shorts Fest — Best of Fest
Golden Star Shorts Fest — Best Narrative Short
Brooklyn International Disability Film Festival — Best Short
Scottsdale International Film Festival — Best Student Short
West Chester Film Festival — Best Female Director
Berkeley Film Festival — Grand Festival Award
Rebel Film Festival — Best Experimental Short
Brown Emerging Filmmakers — Best Drama
Ole Muddy Film Festival — First Place
Harry M. Warner Film Festival — Third Place
Sound Space — Post Award
Calgary International Film Festival — Honorable Mention
California Independent Film Festival — Best Mini Short Nominee
Swansea Bay Film Festival — Best Drama Nominee
Pawky Little Film Contest — Finalist
Trenton Film Festival — Best Actress Nominee

Festivals

Annapolis Film Festival
Antimatter Film Festival
Arpa International Film Festival
Atlanta Film Festival
Avignon Film Festival
Backseat Film Festival
Big Bear Lake Film Festival
Boston Underground Film Festival
Boxurshorts Film Festival
Brainwash Film Festival
Brighton Film Festival
Brooklyn Cinema Series
Brooklyn International Disability Film Festival
Brooklyn International Film Festival
Brooklyn Underground Film Festival
Calgary International Film Festival
California Independent Film Festival
Cannes Film Festival
Cardiff Screen Film Festival
Chicago International Film Festival
Cinechico Film Festival
Cinema Paradise
Clermont-Ferrand Film Festival
Cork International Film Festival
Dance and Shout Film Festival
Daytona Beach Film Festival
DC Shorts Film Festival
DC Underground Film Festival]
Ellensburg Film Festival
Film Platform
First Look Film Festival
First Run Film Festival
Fylmz Festival
Girlfest Hawaii
Global Art Film Festival
Golden Star Shorts Fest
Great Lakes Film Festival
Her Voice Her View Film Festival
Hi Mom Film Festival
Holly Shorts Film Festival
Hudson Valley Film Festival
Inflatable Duck Film Festival
Ladyfest Humboldt
Ladyfest San Diego
Ladyfest Stockholm
Los Angeles Short Film Festival
Lost Film Fest

Malibu International Film Festival
Marblehead Film Festival
Milan International Film Festival
New Filmmakers
Newport Beach Film Festival
Newport International Film Festival
Next Frame Film Festival
Nolita Film Festival
NYC Home Film Festival
Ohio Independent Film Festival
Ojai Film Festival
Ole Muddy Film Festival
Ozark Film Festival
Palm Springs International Short Film Festival
Planet Ant Film Festival
Poppy Jasper Film Festival
Portland Underground Film Festival
Provincetown International Film Festival
Queens International Film Festival
Reel Heart International Film Festival
Reel Women International Film Festival
Rhode Island International Film Festival
Rome International Film Festival
Route 66 Film Festival
San Diego Women Film Festival
San Francisco Independent Film Festival
San Francisco Women's Film Festival
Sarasota Film Festival
Scottsdale International Film Festival
Show Me Missouri Film Festival
Silver Lake Shorts
Slamdance Film Festival
Small Potato Film Festival
Swansea Bay Film Festival
Teabag Film Workshop
Toofy Film Festival
Trenton Film Festival
Vermont International Film Festival
Waterfront Film Festival
West Chester Film Festival
Wichita Film Festival
Wildsound Film Festival
Williamsburg Short Film Festival
Women in Film Film Festival
Woodstock Film Festival
Youth for Human Rights Film Festival
Zion International Film Festival

Reviews
Doug Brunell of Film Threat gave Twitch three stars, saying that "Twitch is a story about fear, love, and an uncertain future. Meyerhoff has secured her place in film with this short movie. She's done a story that is as honest as it is touching. Her ability to sum up a young girl's life in ten minutes is remarkable."

Virginia Heffernan of The New York Times wrote that "Leah is an artsy American" and Elaine Mak of New England Film said that "award-winning director Leah Meyerhoff has built up a large list of accomplishments as a filmmaker."

Jennifer Modenessi of the Contra Costa Times said that "when the story is as good as filmmaker Leah Meyerhoff's, you can't help but be drawn in" and Ben Beard of Film Monthly said that "Twitch is a hard but impressive little film. The travails of growing up, the immense pain of post-adolescence, the terror of the big nasty world resting just outside our windows: Twitch augers in the universal places of hurt in the human brain. We can take solace that Meyerhoff is now working on her first feature-length film. Twitch shows great promise; we now must wait for Meyerhoff's talents to fully bloom."

References

External links

2005 films
2005 short films
American independent films
American student films
2000s English-language films
2000s American films